Ouricuri is a city in the state of Pernambuco, Brazil. It is located in the mesoregion of Sertão Pernambucano. Ouricuri has a total area of 2,423 square kilometers and had an estimated population of 66,978 inhabitants  in 2009 according to the IBGE.

Geography

 State - Pernambuco
 Region - Sertão Pernambucano
 Boundaries - Araripina, Trindade and Ipubi (N), Santa Cruz and Santa Filomena (S), Parnamirim and Bodocó  (E), Piaui state (W)
 Area - 2,423 km2
 Elevation - 451 m
 Hydrography - Brigida River
 Vegetation - Caatinga
 Climate - Semi-arid (Sertao) hot and dry
 Annual average temperature - 25.5 c
 Main road -  BR 232 and BR 316
 Distance to Recife - 621 km

Economy

The main economic activities in Ouricuri are based in extraction of gypsum and no metallic minerals, and primary sector especially creation of goats, donkeys, pigs and farms with beans, manioc and corn. Ouricuri is located in the micro region of Araripina which contains 95% of the Brazilian reserves of Gypsum.

Economic Indicators

Economy by Sector
2006

Health Indicators

The institutions that is responsible for public healthcare in Ouricuri and region of the Araripe are; Municipal Health Secretary of Ouricuri (SMSO), Intermunicipal Health Consortium of Pernambuco (CIAPE)

References

Municipalities in Pernambuco